Aleksander Balos (born 1970) is a Romani-Polish-American artist and figurative painter, known for his classical photorealistic paintings depicting contemporary subject matter and narrative. He currently lives in the United States and is a naturalised American.

Life and art
Aleksander Balos was born in Gliwice, Poland. His father Jan worked in an industrial factory and his mother Janina was a schoolteacher. Neither was a member of the Communist Party Polska Zjednoczona Partia Robotnicza or PZPR, and due to Jan’s candid criticisms of government policies during the 1980s, his name was placed on a list to be sent to a Soviet labor camp. Following Janina's death in 1982, Aleksander's health declined until he suffered a severe case of rheumatic fever which damaged his heart, rendering him medically housebound at age 14 for a period of six months. Due to his personal challenges and the overall socio-economic climate of mid-1980s Poland, Balos focused his attention over the next few years searching for a means to leave the country and emigrate to the West. In the summer of 1989 at the age of 18 he was able to relocate to the United States, after receiving a student visa to attend St. Joseph High School in Kenosha, Wisconsin. While there he received the encouragement of his art teacher Kathy Gagliardi, who assisted him in applying to colleges to study art.

Balos received a full scholarship to Cardinal Stritch University in Milwaukee WI, where he studied painting and drawing with Philosophy Professor Garry Rosine. After completing his BFA and experiencing his first museum show at Charles Allis Art Museum and exhibited at Northwestern Mutual Art Gallery at Cardinal Stritch as an Alumni in 2009.  In 1995 Balos relocated to Chicago to study in the classical European atelier program at the School of Representational Art with Bruno Surdo and Mike Chelich. Here he primarily studied drawing and painting of the human form. In 1998, he exhibited his triptych Last Supper at Ann Nathan Gallery in Chicago, which led to subsequent shows in Chicago, as well as in other cities in the U.S. and Europe. Figurative realism and portraiture constituted most of the body of Balos' work in the '90s and early 2000s. During that time, Balos returned frequently to Europe to research painting techniques and contents of the old masters' paintings. Balos' work utilizes the human figure to portray various ideals and faults of human existence without suggesting solutions. The narrative compositions are intended to be interpreted by the audience, as only then the paintings gain their temporal and subjective meaning. While in Chicago, Balos also became an American citizen.

Since 1997 Balos has been represented by the Ann Nathan Gallery in Chicago, where he has held five solo exhibitions. Since 2000 Balos has contributed work to art gallery shows in New York, Atlanta, Chicago, Paris, Utrecht and Barcelona; and for art fairs such as The Armory Show in NY, Art Chicago, EXPO Chicago, Palm Beach3, Art Palm Beach, WWK Biennale in Munich, and the Royal Academy Summer Exhibition in London.

In 2005 Balos relocated to Northern California and since then his body of work has expanded to include looser applications, utilizing abstractions and multi-media techniques and styles. Balos also teaches drawing and painting privately at his atelier school  ArtRoster in Mount Shasta, where his students host an annual "Forgery Show"  on April 1 of each year.

In 2018 Balos started Vast Self, a 501(c)(3) public charity #83-1669166

Solo exhibitions

 1996 - Clara Voce Cogito, Chastain Zollinger Gallery, Chicago, IL
 1999 - Martyrs & Sinners, Ann Nathan Gallery, Chicago, IL
 2001 - Parables, Ann Nathan Gallery, Chicago, IL
 2003–2004 - New Paintings, Ann Nathan Gallery, Chicago, IL
 2005 - New York, Ann Nathan Gallery, Chicago, IL
 2005 - Travaux Récents, by Arts nord sud at Crédit Municipal de Paris, Espace Griffon, Paris, France
 2006 - Figurative Realism, Utrecht Gallery, Utrecht, Netherlands
 2011 - Paintings, Ann Nathan Gallery, Chicago, IL
 2011 - New Paintings, Red Door Gallery, Mt.Shasta, CA
 2012 -  Paintings, Stock in Art Gallery, Mt.Shasta, CA

Group exhibitions

 1991 - Annual Juried Show, 234 Gallery, Kenosha, WI
 1995 - Annual Spring Show, League of Milwaukee Artists, The Charles Allis Art Museum, Milwaukee, WI
 1995 - Paintings, David Barnett Gallery/Rice Building, Milwaukee, WI
 1995 - Elevations, Layton Gallery, Milwaukee, WI
 1995 - Paintings of Figures, August House Studio, Chicago, IL
 1998 - Paintings, Ann Nathan Gallery, Chicago, IL
 1999 - The Chicago Art Scene, Belloc Lowndes Gallery, Chicago, IL
 1999 - The Figure Studied : An Examination of the Historical and Contemporary Perspective on the Human Form, Crossman Gallery, University of Wisconsin, WI
 2002 - Young Painters, Miami University, Oxford, OH
 2002 - Art Chicago, Navy Pier, Chicago, IL
 2003 - Armory Show, New York, N.Y
 2003 - Art Chicago, Navy Pier, Chicago, IL
 2004 - Art Chicago, Navy Pier, Chicago, IL
 2005 - Form and Substance, Agora Gallery, New York, NY
 2005 - Palm Beach 3, Palm Beach, FL
 2005 - Crucifixion, Mito Gallery, Barcelona, Spain
 2005 - The Summer Show, Royal Academy of Arts, London, England
 2006 - Figure,  Figure, Utrecht Gallery, Utrecht, Netherlands
 2006 - Palm Beach 3, Palm Beach, FL
 2006 - Acquisition Exhibition,  Gallery 180 of The Illinois Institute of Art-Chicago
 2006 - Realism,  Utrecht Gallery, Utrecht, Netherlands
 2007 - Palm Beach 3, Palm Beach, FL
 2007 - All Media,  Gallery 180 of The Illinois Institute of Art-Chicago
 2007 -  Into the Heart of The Southwest,  Forbes Galleries New York, NY
 2007 - The Painters, Lowe Gallery, Atlanta, GA
 2008 - Palm Beach3, Palm Beach, FL
 2008 - Art Chicago, Merchandise Mart, Chicago, IL
 2008 - WWK Biennale, Pasinger Fabrik, Munich, Germany
 2008 - Dreamscape, Loods 6, Amsterdam, Netherlands
 2009 - Self Portrait Project, Liberty Art Gallery, Yreka, CA
 2009 - Alumni Exhibition, Northwestern Mutual Gallery, Milwaukee, WI
 2009 - Genesis, Chalk Gallery, Santa Fe, NM
 2011 - Female Creature, Liberty Arts, Yreka, CA
 2011 - Black and White, Liberty Art Gallery, Yreka, CA
 2012 - Bark!, John Natsoulas, Davis, CA
 2013 – 1748 – 2013, Retzlaff & Thorndike Galleries, Ashland, OR
 2014 – 5th Annual Art of Painting in the 21st Century, John Natsoulas, Davis, CA
 2015 – The Forgery Show, Snow Creek Studios, Mount Shasta, CA
 2016 – The Forgery Show, Pence Gallery, Davis, CA
 2017 – Spectrum-Gestalt 4, Bleicher/Gorman Gallery , Santa Monica, CA
 2017 – Sweet n Low, Bedford Gallery, Walnut Creek, CA
 2018 – The Forgery Show NY, Morris Adjmi Architects, New York, NY
 2019 – Fake It, Blue Line Arts, Roseville, CA

Distinctions
Florence Biennale Invited to Florence Biennale 2007
Forbes Trinchera Residency co-sponsored by American Artist magazine

Publications

 Metamorphosis 2, 2008
 Dreamscape 2, Netherlands 2008
 Direct Art Magazine, #13, NY, article Fall 2006
 The Departed, Martin Scorsese, 2005
  Who's Who in International Professionals, 2004
 Miroir de l’Art, Number 4, Paris, 2004
 NY Arts Magazine, his philosophy on art 2002
 G. Jurek Polanski, Parables, Artscopes.net, April 2001
 ArtNet, dealers selling his art 2000
 New American Paintings, Juried Exhibition in Print, Number 29, Open Studio Press, 2000
 G. Jurek Polanski, Mystical Realism of Eastern and Western Spirituality, Arscope.net, November 1999
 The Chicago Art Scene: Sixty-eight Contemporary Artists, Book, Crow Woods Publishing, 1998

Notes and references

 
 Glossary: Figurative Tate online. Accessed May 22, 2006
 Glossary: Surreal Tate online. Accessed May 22, 2006
 Glossary: Representational Tate online. Accessed May 22, 2006

External links
 
 Aleksander Balos on Artnet
 Aleksander Balos on MutualArt
 Aleksander Balos virtual gallery on the Artabus web site

1970 births
Living people
20th-century American painters
American male painters
21st-century American painters
21st-century American male artists
American engravers
20th-century American sculptors
20th-century American male artists
American male sculptors
20th-century American printmakers
20th-century engravers